Taean Lee clan is one of the Korean clans. Their Bon-gwan is in Taean County, South Chungcheong Province. According to the research held in 2000, the number of Taean Lee clan’s member was 4084. Their founder was  who was a descendant of Lee Seung nam in Tang dynasty.  was from Longxi Commandery, China.  exiled himself to Taean in Goryeo to avoid conflictions in Goryeo during Gwangjong of Goryeo’s reign. Then, Lee Cheon founded Taean Lee clan and made Taean, Taean Lee clan’s Bon-gwan.

See also 
 Korean clan names of foreign origin

References

External links 
 

 
Korean clan names of Chinese origin
Yi clans